Pseudopusula is a genus of small sea snails, marine gastropod mollusks in the family Triviidae, the false cowries or trivias.

Species
Species within the genus Pseudopusula are as follows:
 Pseudopusula africana (F. A. Schilder, 1931)
 Pseudopusula antillarum (Schilder, 1922)
Pseudopusula californiana (Gray, 1827)
 Pseudopusula campus (C. N. Cate, 1979)
† Pseudopusula canariensis (Rothpletz & Simonelli, 1890)
 Pseudopusula circumdata (F. A. Schilder, 1931)
 † Pseudopusula floridana (Olsson & Harbison, 1953) 
 Pseudopusula fusca (Gray in G. B. Sowerby I, 1832)
 Pseudopusula galapagensis (Melvill, 1900)
Pseudopusula geigeri Fehse & Grego, 2014
 Pseudopusula gerberi Fehse & Grego, 2020
 Pseudopusula grohorum (Fehse & Grego, 2008)
 † Pseudopusula incomparabilis (Fehse, 2013) 
 † Pseudopusula jozefgregoi (Fehse, 2011) 
† Pseudopusula parcicosta (Reiss, 1862)
 † Pseudopusula permixta (de Cristofori & Jan, 1832) 
 Pseudopusula peruviana Fehse & Grego, 2020
† Pseudopusula praecursor Fehse & Grego, 2014
 Pseudopusula problematica (F. A. Schilder, 1931)
Pseudopusula rota (Weinkauff, 1881)
 Pseudopusula rubescens (J. E. Gray, 1833)
Pseudopusula sanguinea (Sowerby, 1832)
 Pseudopusula spongicola (Monterosato, 1923)
Species brought into synonymy
Pseudopusula depauperata (Sowerby, 1832): synonym of Discotrivia depauperata (G. B. Sowerby I, 1832)

References

Triviidae